Rev. Fr. Mathew Naickomparambil V C is the founder of Divine Retreat Centre, Potta. He is a gospel preacher. His sermons are aired daily on Shalom TV India, Divine TV , and Goodness TV India.

References

External links
Website

Living people
1947 births
Television evangelists
20th-century Indian Roman Catholic priests
Television personalities from Kerala
21st-century Indian Roman Catholic priests